National Radio Network (NRN) was a commercial radio network in United States. It is owned and operated by Langer Broadcasting, which is located in Framingham, Massachusetts, and was operated from flagship station WSRO. The network primarily relied on other networks, including CRN Digital Talk Radio Networks and the USA Radio Network, to provide programming over a very limited network of affiliates. It ceased operations in 2010 when WSRO switched to Portuguese language programming.

External links
National Radio Network

Defunct radio networks in the United States
Companies based in Massachusetts
Radio stations disestablished in 2010

Defunct radio stations in the United States